Shavertown was a hamlet in Delaware County, New York. It was sacrificed and laid under water with the construction of the Pepacton Reservoir in 1954. Shavertown had a few hundred inhabitants, mostly reliant on the town's timber industry. The Delaware and Eastern Railroad ran through the town.

References

Geography of Delaware County, New York
Hamlets in Delaware County, New York